A hydrogen-donor solvent is hydrocarbon that transfers hydrogen to hydrogen-poor substrates, such as coal.  The hydrogen-poor substrates could be a solute or suspension.  The classic hydrogen-donor solvent (or just donor solvent) is tetrahydronaphthalene, which converts to  naphthalene by transfer of two equivalents of H2 to the substrate.  The enthalpy of hydrogenation of naphthalene is relatively low, which allows the tetrahydronaphthalene to be regenerated in the presence of high pressure H2.  Catalysts are often used, such as molybdenum disulfide.  Related hydrogen donor solvents or solvent components are dihydrophenanthrene and tetrahydroquinoline.

References

Coal
Synthetic fuel technologies